Lawrence "Tricky" Lofton (born May 28, 1930, Houston) is an American jazz trombonist. He studied with Kid Ory, and J. J. Johnson, and made several recordings with Carmell Jones.

Discography

As sideman
 Bill Doggett, Dance Awhile with Doggett (King, 1958)
 Richard "Groove" Holmes, Groove (Pacific Jazz, 1961)
 Richard "Groove" Holmes, Tell It Like It Tis (Pacific Jazz, 1966)
 Carmell Jones, Mosaic Select (Mosaic, 2003)
 Les McCann, Les McCann Sings (Pacific Jazz, 1961)
 Les McCann, Oh Brother! (Fontana, 1964)
 Jimmy McGriff, Let's Stay Together (Groove Merchant, 1972)

References

1930 births
Living people
American jazz trombonists
Male trombonists
21st-century trombonists
21st-century American male musicians
American male jazz musicians